Huapi may refer to:

 Huapi, Hebei (化皮镇), town in Xinle, Hebei, China
 Huapi, Henan (华陂镇), town in Shangcai County, Henan, China
 Huapi Island, island in Ranco Lake, southern Chile
 Huapi (mountain), a mountain in the Peruvian Andes
 "The Painted Skin", a short story by Pu Songling from Strange Tales from a Chinese Studio
 Painted Skin (2008 film), a film adaptation
 Painted Skin (TV series), a TV adaptation

See also
Painted Skin (disambiguation)